is a Japan-exclusive Visual novel/Adventure game, developed and published by Kadokawa Shoten for the Nintendo DS, based on the anime Sora no Otoshimono Forte, the second season of Sora no Otoshimono.

Gameplay

The game mostly consists of typical visual novel/dating simulator gameplay in which the main character, Tomoki, visits and talks to his friends, and you decide which dialogue option to choose next in order to further various game options. Once in a while, you get to pleasure one of the girls, where you use the DS Stylus Pen to tap and rub on different body parts. The longer it takes, the lower your achieved score.

The game's RPG/dating sim-esque elements include various RPG elements, such as earning money and upgrading your character's stats. Money is earned through the various pleasuring-games encountered. Money is spent on sorts of training activities.

The game has 6 chapters. After you've beaten it, you are able to skip past already-read dialogue.

See also
List of video games based on anime or manga

External links
Official website 
Release information at GameFAQs

2011 video games
Japan-exclusive video games
Kadokawa Shoten games
Nintendo DS games
Nintendo DS-only games
Visual novels
Video games based on anime and manga
Video games developed in Japan